Bruno Miguel de Oliveira Nunes (born 16 October, 1976) is a Portuguese businessman and politician of the Chega party and a member of the Assembly of the Republic for the Setúbal district constituency.

Nunes has been involved in Portuguese politics for over twenty years and began his career as a member of the  People's Monarchist Party. He stood as a candidate for the party during the 2014 European Parliament election. He joined Chega in 2019 and was elected as a municipal councilor for the party in Loures in 2021. 

For the 2022 Portuguese legislative election, Nunes was elected to parliament to represent the Setúbal district. He currently sits on the committees for European affairs, local government and the constitution. He is also vice-president of the Chega parliamentary group.

References

1976 births
Portuguese politicians
21st-century Portuguese politicians
Chega politicians
Members of the Assembly of the Republic (Portugal)
Living people